Cheerios is a brand of cereal manufactured by General Mills in the United States, consisting of pulverized oats in the shape of a solid torus. In some countries, including the United Kingdom, Cheerios is marketed by Cereal Partners under the Nestlé brand; in Australia and New Zealand, Cheerios is sold as an Uncle Tobys product. It was first manufactured in 1941 as CheeriOats.

History 
Cheerios was introduced on May 2, 1941, as "Cheerioats". The name was shortened to "Cheerios" on December 2, 1945 after a competing cereal manufacturer, Quaker Oats, claimed to hold the rights to use the term "oats".

Cheerios' production was based upon the extrusion process invented for Kix in 1937. The oat flour process starts in Minneapolis before being shipped to factories in Iowa, Georgia and Buffalo, New York.

In July 3, 1976, "Cinnamon Nut Cheerios" was the first departure from the original flavor of Cheerios, over 30 years after the cereal was created, the second was "Honey Nut Cheerios", introduced on March 1, 1979. General Mills sold approximately 1.8 million cases of Honey Nut Cheerios in its first year.

Since their introduction, Cheerios have become a popular baby food. Generally first fed to children aged 9–12 months, Cheerios serve to help infants transition to eating solid food, as well as develop fine motor skills.

Ingredients
In January 2014, General Mills announced that it would halt the use of genetically modified ingredients in original Cheerios. However, General Mills notes for Original Cheerios that "trace amounts of genetically modified (also known as 'genetically engineered') material may be present due to potential cross contact during manufacturing and shipping". In February 2015, the company announced that it would be making Cheerios totally gluten-free by removing the traces of wheat, rye, and barley that usually come into contact with the oat supply used to make Cheerios during transportation to the General Mills plant in Buffalo, New York, along Lake Erie.

Advertising
Many television commercials for Cheerios have targeted children, featuring animated characters (such as a Honeybee). Bullwinkle was featured in early 1960s commercials, with the tag line at the end of the ad being "Go with Cheerios!" followed by Bullwinkle, usually worse for wear due to his Cheerios-inspired bravery somewhat backfiring, saying "...but watch where you're going!" Hoppity Hooper was also featured in ads in the mid-1960s; General Mills was the primary sponsor of his animated program.

Cheeri O'Leary

This cartoon character, a cheery young girl, was seen in 1942–1943 magazine advertising and in Sunday newspaper's comics sections. These ads were multi-panel cartoons where Cheeri O'Leary interacted with entertainers of the day, including Charlotte Greenwood, Barbara Stanwyck, Dick Powell, Joan Blondell, Johnny Mack Brown, Betty Hutton, and Claudette Colbert.

The Cheerios Kid
Beginning in the mid-1950s and continuing through the early 1960s, "The Cheerios Kid" was a mainstay in Cheerios commercials. The Kid, after eating Cheerios, quickly dealt with whatever problem presented in the commercial, using oat-produced "Big-G, little-o" "Go-power." By the late 1960s, there was a jingle called "Get Yourself Go" (written by Neil Diamond), which played as the two use go power to solve the problem. The character was revived briefly in the late 1980s in similar commercials. In 2012, The Cheerios Kid and sidekick Sue were revived in an internet video that showed how Cheerios "can lower cholesterol." Video clips of "the Kid" and Sue are part of a montage included in a 2014 TV commercial, along with clips of the Honey Nut Cheerios bee's early commercials.

Peanuts
In 1984 and 1985, characters from the comic strip Peanuts were featured in many Cheerios commercials. In the commercials, the characters become tired in the middle of performing an activity (e.g. taking a dance lesson, playing tennis), but then another character tells them that they did not have a healthy Cheerios breakfast. Then, at the end of the commercial, the character would be energized, followed by children singing "You're on your toes with Cheerios!"

Spoonfuls of Stories
The Spoonfuls of Stories program, begun in 2002, is sponsored by Cheerios and a 50/50 joint venture of General Mills and Simon & Schuster. Mini-sized versions of Simon & Schuster children's books are published within the program when the book drive occurs. The program also includes a New Author contest; winners' books are published in miniature inside boxes of Cheerios.

Shawn Johnson
In 2009, Olympic gold medalist and World Champion gymnast Shawn Johnson became the first athlete to have her photo featured on the front of the Cheerios box. The limited edition was distributed in the Midwestern region of the United States by the Hy-Vee grocery store chain.

Just Checking

In 2013, a Cheerios commercial aired, titled "Just Checking," showcasing an interracial family in which a daughter asks her mother (white) if Cheerios is good for the heart, as her father (black) mentioned. The mother says the cereal is good according to the box which states that the whole grain oats lower cholesterol. The next scene features the father waking up as a pile of Cheerios spill down his chest, which the daughter placed there having taken her father's words literally. The commercial received unintentional notoriety due to the racist anger at the commercial showing a biracial family. This was so extreme that General Mills disabled further comments on the video. In 2014, General Mills released a Super Bowl ad titled "Gracie," featuring the same family: in the commercial, the father, using Cheerios to illustrate his meaning, tells the daughter that a new baby is coming, that her mother is pregnant, and the daughter accepts this—as long as they also get a puppy—and the father agrees, while the mother looks a little surprised.

Vortexx
To promote the premiere of the Vortexx Saturday morning block on The CW Television Network in August 2012, special boxes of Cheerios were branded as "Vortexx O's," complete with the schedule on the back, and the wordmark plastered on one of the Vortexx promotional backgrounds. Toys were also included in the box, featuring John Cena, Iron Man, and the Pink Power Ranger.

Good Goes Around
In 2017, Latrell James was hired to sing a song for a new Cheerios commercial, with the refrain "Good goes around and around and around."

Murray the Brave
In May 2020, during the COVID-19 pandemic in Canada, it partnered with Food Banks Canada to do a tribute to food bank workers.

Return of "Cheerioats" for 80th Anniversary

Beginning in July 2021, a limited re-release of Cheerios cereal was made across North American markets with the reuse of the original brand name "Cheerioats" instead of "Cheerios." Cheerioats used the same ingredients as modern day Cheerios, but was repackaged in a throwback campaign to celebrate the 80th anniversary of Cheerios cereals being sold (1941–2021).

Products

 Cereals
 Cheerios (originally named Cheerioats) (1941)
 Cinnamon Nut Cheerios (1976)
 Honey Nut Cheerios (1979)
 Apple Cinnamon Cheerios (1988)
 MultiGrain Cheerios (Original in the UK) (released 1992, relaunched 2009)
 Frosted Cheerios (1995) (not related to Frosty O's)
 Yogurt Burst Cheerios (variations include vanilla and strawberry) (2005)
 Fruity Cheerios (2006) (Cheerios sweetened with fruit juice)
 Oat Cluster Crunch Cheerios (2007) (sweetened Cheerios with oat clusters)
 Banana Nut Cheerios (2009) (sweetened Cheerios made with banana puree)
 Chocolate Cheerios (2010) (Cheerios made with cocoa)
 Cinnamon Burst Cheerios (2011) (Cheerios made with cinnamon)
 MultiGrain Peanut Butter Cheerios (2012) (Multigrain Cheerios with sorghum, not wheat, and peanut butter)
 Multi Grain Cheerios Dark Chocolate Crunch (2013)
 Cheerios Protein (variations include Oats & Honey and Cinnamon Almond) (2014)
 Ancient Grain Cheerios (2015) (sweetened Cheerios made with "ancient grains like kamut wheat, spelt, and quinoa")
 Pumpkin Spice Cheerios (sweetened Cheerios made with pumpkin purée and pumpkin pie spices) (2016) (limited edition)
 Chocolate Peanut Butter Cheerios (a blend of two types of sweetened Cheerios, one with a cocoa coating, the other with peanut butter) (Limited Edition in 2016, made permanent 2017)
 Strawberry Cheerios (sweetened Cheerios made with strawberry purée) (2017) (Limited Edition)
 Very Berry Cheerios (sweetened Cheerios with strawberry, blueberry and raspberry flavors) (2017)
 Peach Cheerios (sweetened Cheerios made with peach purée) (2018) (Limited Edition)
 Blueberry Cheerios (with blueberry purée concentrate) (2019)
 Maple Cheerios (sweetened with maple syrup) (2017 in Canada, 2019 in the United States)
 Cinnamon Cheerios (made with cinnamon) (2020)
 Toasted Coconut Cheerios (limited edition) (2020)
 Frosted Vanilla Cheerios (2021 in Canada only)
 Chocolate Strawberry Cheerios (limited edition) (2021)
 Banana Caramel Cheerios (limited edition) (2022)
 Honey Vanilla Cheerios (2022)
 Strawberry Banana Cheerios (2022)
 Frosted Lemon Cheerios (limited edition) (2023)

 Snacks
Cheerios Snack Mix – Original (2008) (Cheerios, Corn Chex, Wheat Chex, round crackers, pretzels and cracker sticks flavored with garlic and onion)
Cheerios Snack Mix – Cheese (2008) (Cheerios, Corn Chex, Wheat Chex, triangle crackers, pretzels and cracker sticks flavored with cheese)

 Licensed products
 Crispy Oats (manufactured by Millville, distributed by ALDI)
 Purely O's (Organic Cheerios, manufactured by General Mills subsidiary Cascadian Farms) (1999)
 Oat Cheerios (Republic of Ireland only, manufactured by Cereal Partners Worldwide, sold under the Nestlé brand)

Discontinued products

 Cheerios and X's (1993)
 Team Cheerios (formerly Team USA Cheerios) (1996–2003)
 Millenios (Cheerios with "2"-shaped cereal pieces) (1999–2000)
 Berry Burst Cheerios (including variations of Strawberry, Strawberry Banana, Cherry Vanilla and Triple Berry) (2003)
 Dulce de Leche Cheerios (2012) (sweetened Cheerios made with caramel)
 Banana Nut Cheerios (2015–2016) (sweetened Cheerios made with banana puree)

2009 FDA demand
In May 2009, the U.S. Food and Drug Administration sent a letter to General Mills indicating that Cheerios was being sold as an unapproved new drug, due to labeling which read in part:

* "You can Lower Your Cholesterol 4% in 6 weeks"
 "Did you know that in just 6 weeks Cheerios can reduce bad cholesterol by an average of 4 percent? Cheerios is ... clinically proven to lower cholesterol. A clinical study showed that eating two 1½ cup servings daily of Cheerios cereal reduced bad cholesterol when eaten as part of a diet low in saturated fat and cholesterol."

The FDA letter indicated that General Mills needed to change the way it marketed Cheerios or apply for federal approval to sell Cheerios as a drug. General Mills responded with a statement that their claim of soluble fiber content had been approved by the FDA, and that claims about lowering cholesterol had been featured on the box for two years.

In 2012, the FDA followed up with a letter approving the Cheerios labeling and declaring that the matter was moot and required no further action.

See also
 Cheerios effect
 Cruncheroos

References

External links

 

Nestlé cereals
General Mills cereals
Products introduced in 1941